L'ami du Peuple is the seventh album by Chicago musician Mike Kinsella. under the moniker Owen.  The record was released on July 2, 2013. It features ten tracks, recorded with collaboration from various musicians in the Chicago area indie hardcore scene. The introspective songs are written by Kinsella, and the instrumentation includes greater use of electronics and bowed strings than in his previous albums.

Development
The title of the album was taken from the newspaper of the same name written during the French Revolution. The album was produced by Neil Strauch, and released through Polyvinyl Records.

Track listing

References

2013 albums
Owen (musician) albums
Polyvinyl Record Co. albums